The 2021 J1 League, also known as the  for sponsorship reasons, was the 29th season of the J1 League, the top Japanese professional league for association football clubs, since its establishment in 1993. The league began on 26 February and ended on 4 December 2021.

Kawasaki Frontale were the reigning champions, having won their third title in 2020 with four rounds to play. They successfully retained the title, again with four rounds to play.

On 20 November 2021, Oita Trinita, Vegalta Sendai, and Yokohama FC were relegated to J2 League with two games to play. On the final matchday Tokushima Vortis was relegated back to J2 League after just one season.

Changes from the previous season
There were no teams relegated last season due to impacts related to the COVID-19 pandemic. Instead, four relegation places were applied for the current season to reduce the total number of teams from 20 back to 18.

Two teams were promoted from the 2020 J2 League: Tokushima Vortis won the title and clinched a second promotion to J1 (the first came in 2013), while Avispa Fukuoka came second, returning to J1 after five seasons.

Clubs

Personnel and kits

Managerial changes

Foreign players
As of 2021 season, there were no more restrictions on a number of signed foreign players, but clubs could only register up to five foreign players for a single match-day squad. Players from J.League partner nations (Thailand, Vietnam, Myanmar, Malaysia, Cambodia, Singapore, Indonesia and Qatar) were exempted from these restrictions.

Players name in bold indicates the player is registered during the mid-season transfer window.
Player's name in italics indicates the player has Japanese nationality in addition to their FIFA nationality, or is exempt from being treated as a foreign player due to having been born in Japan and being enrolled in, or having graduated from an approved type of school in the country.

League table

Results table

Season statistics

Scoring

Top scorers

Hat-tricks

Top assists

Discipline

Player
Most yellow cards: 9
 Douglas Grolli (Avispa Fukuoka)

Most red cards: 2
 Takumi Kamijima (Kashiwa Reysol)
 Kim Min-tae (Nagoya Grampus)
 Takaaki Shichi (Avispa Fukuoka)

Club
Most yellow cards: 49
Avispa Fukuoka
Kashima Antlers

Most red cards: 3
FC Tokyo
Kashima Antlers
Sagan Tosu
Yokohama F. Marinos

See also 
J.League MVP of the month

References

External links
 Official website, JLeague.co 

J1 League seasons
Japan
1